The Big Fork State Forest is a state forest located in Koochiching and Itasca counties, Minnesota. It is primarily managed by the Minnesota Department of Natural Resources. The landscape has many moraines, lakes, and wetlands. The "Lost 40" and the largest red pine in the state of Minnesota are located within the forest. 

Outdoor recreation activities include hiking, mountain biking, and cross-country skiing on provided trails, as well as backcountry camping, swimming, fishing. 
There is boat, canoe, and kayak access to the Big Fork River which runs through a portion of the forest, with Class I, III, IV, and V rapids located downstream.

See also
List of Minnesota state forests

References

External links
Big Fork State Forest - Minnesota Department of Natural Resources (DNR)
A rare 'Lost 40' of old-growth forest survives untouched video

Minnesota state forests
Protected areas of Koochiching County, Minnesota
Protected areas of Itasca County, Minnesota
Protected areas established in 1963
1963 establishments in Minnesota